Hiranandani Group was established in 1978 by Niranjan Hiranandani and Surendra Hiranandani and is based in Mumbai, India. The group is one of the largest real estate developers in India with projects across Mumbai, Bangalore, Chennai, and Hyderabad. The group has diversified into health, education, energy, and hospitality. In July 2020, the group launched the world's second largest data center, Yotta NM1 in its Integrated Yotta Data Center Park, under the subsidiary Yotta Infrastructure, in Navi Mumbai.

Projects 

 Hiranandani Gardens, Mumbai
 Hiranandani Estate, Thane
 House of Hiranandani, Chennai
 Hiranandani Meadows, Thane
 Hiranandani Loftline, Hyderabad
 Hiranandani Foundation Schools
 Hiranandani Foundation School, Powai
 Hiranandani Foundation School, Thane
 Hiranandani Upscale School
 Dr. L. H. Hiranandani College of Pharmacy

References 

Real estate companies based in Mumbai
Indian companies established in 1978
1978 establishments in Maharashtra
Real estate companies established in 1978